Kent Creek is a tributary of the Lynn River, one of the watersheds administered by the Long Point Region Conservation Authority.  It is considered a cold-water stream, and hosts a population of Brook Trout.  It drains .

References

Long Point Region Conservation Authority
Rivers of Ontario
 
Landforms of Norfolk County, Ontario